Democratic Socialist Alliance (ASDCI) was a Spanish party alliance formed to contest the 1977 general election by the Spanish Socialist Workers' Party (historical) (PSOEh) and the Spanish Democratic Socialist Party (PSDE). Spanish Social Reform (RSE) was expected to be a member of the alliance, but both the PSOEh and RSE broke up during the making up of the candidates' lists.

Member parties
Spanish Socialist Workers' Party (historical) (PSOEh)
Spanish Democratic Socialist Party (PSDE)

References

Defunct political party alliances in Spain
Defunct social democratic parties in Spain
1976 establishments in Spain
1977 disestablishments in Spain